A dodecagonal number is a figurate number that represents a dodecagon. The dodecagonal number for n is given by the formula

The first few dodecagonal numbers are:
0, 1, 12, 33, 64, 105, 156, 217, 288, 369, 460, 561, 672, 793, 924, 1065, 1216, 1377, 1548, 1729, 1920, 2121, 2332, 2553, 2784, 3025, 3276, 3537, 3808, 4089, 4380, 4681, 4992, 5313, 5644, 5985, 6336, 6697, 7068, 7449, 7840, 8241, 8652, 9073, 9504, 9945 ...

Properties

The dodecagonal number for n can be calculated by adding the square of n to four times the (n - 1)th pronic number, or to put it algebraically, .

Dodecagonal numbers consistently alternate parity, and in base 10, their units place digits follow the pattern 1, 2, 3, 4, 5, 6, 7, 8, 9, 0.

By the Fermat polygonal number theorem, every number is the sum of at most 12 dodecagonal numbers.

 is the sum of the first n natural numbers congruent to 1 mod 10.

 is the sum of all odd numbers from 4n+1 to 6n+1.

See also
 Polygonal number
 Figurate number
 Dodecagon

Figurate numbers